Behaviour is a double-blind peer-reviewed scientific journal covering all aspects of ethology. It is published by Brill Publishers and was established in 1948 by Niko Tinbergen and W.H. Thorpe. The editor-in-chief is Frans de Waal (Emory University).

Abstracting and indexing 
The journal is abstracted and indexed in:

According to the Journal Citation Reports, the journal has a 2020 impact factor of 1.991.

References

External links 
 

Ethology journals
Brill Publishers academic journals
Publications established in 1949
English-language journals
Journals published between 13 and 25 times per year